The 1985 Ballon d'Or, given to the best football player in Europe as judged by a panel of sports journalists from UEFA member countries, was awarded to Michel Platini on 24 December 1985.

Rankings

References

External links 

 France Football Official Ballon d'Or page

1985
1985–86 in European football